Eccellenza Marche is the regional Eccellenza football division for clubs in the region of Marche, Italy. It comprises 16 teams. The winners of the Groups are promoted to Serie D. The club who finishes second also have the chance to gain promotion, they are entered into a national play-off which consists of two rounds.

Champions
Below are the past champions of the Marche Eccellenza

1991–92 Maceratese
1992–93 Tolentino
1993–94 Jesina
1994–95 Sambenedettese
1995–96 Lucrezia
1996–97 Urbania
1997–98 Monturanese
1998–99 Civitanovese
1999–2000 Real Montecchio
2000–01 Cagliese
2001–02 Truentina
2002–03 Imab Urbino
2003–04 Pergolese
2004–05 Maceratese
2005–06 Centobuchi
2006–07 Recanatese
2007–08 Elpidiense Cascinare
2008–09 Fossombrone
2009–10 Sambenedettese
2010–11 Ancona 1905
2011–12 Maceratese
2012–13 Matelica
2013–14 Sambenedettese
2014–15 Folgore Veregra
2015–16 Civitanovese
2016–17 Sangiustese
2017–18 Montegiorgio
2018–19 Tolentino
2019–20 Castelfidardo
2020–21 Porto d'Ascoli
2021–22 Vigor Senigallia

References

External links
Some Club Histories In the League

Sport in le Marche
Mar
Sports leagues established in 1991
1991 establishments in Italy
Football clubs in Italy
Association football clubs established in 1991